Beechmount may refer to:
 Beechmount, Edinburgh, Scotland, usually considered part of Murrayfield
 Beechmount, Belfast, an electoral ward of West Belfast, Northern Ireland
 Beechmount, Rathkeale, home of Albert Gregory Waller and the ancestral seat of the Waller baronetcy in Ireland